The deputy chief minister of the Australian Capital Territory is the second-most senior officer in the Government of the Australian Capital Territory. The deputy chief ministership has been a ministerial portfolio since its establishment in 1989. Unlike in other states and territories, the deputy chief minister of the ACT is not nominally appointed by an administrator or vice-regal, but by the chief minister.

The current deputy chief minister is the Labor Party's Yvette Berry who took over from former Labor Deputy leader Simon Corbell on 31 October 2016, following Corbell's retirement at the 2016 Australian Capital Territory general election.

History and duties
The office of Deputy Chief Minister was created in May 1989, for Paul Whalan, the Deputy Leader of the Labor Party, following the formation of the first government of the Australian Capital Territory Legislative Assembly. The duties of the deputy chief minister are to act on behalf of the chief minister of the Australian Capital Territory in his or her absence overseas or on leave. The deputy chief minister has always been a member of the Cabinet, and has always held at least one substantive portfolio (It would be technically possible for a minister to hold only the portfolio of Deputy Chief Minister, but this has never happened).

If the chief minister were to die, become incapacitated or resign, the Assembly would normally elect the deputy chief minister as chief minister.  If the governing or majority party had not yet elected a new leader, that appointment would be on an interim basis.  Should a different leader emerge, that person would then be appointed chief minister.

For a short period, between 29 May 1991 and 18 June 1991, there was no deputy chief minister as the chief minister, Trevor Kaine, has assumed all ministerial responsibilities.

Gary Humphries, Katy Gallagher and Andrew Barr are the only deputy chief ministers who have gone on to become chief minister. Trevor Kaine is the only chief minister who has taken a 'backward' step to become deputy chief minister.

List of deputy chief ministers of the Australian Capital Territory

1 Despite Labor Chief Minister, Follett, losing a no confidence vote in the Assembly on 5 December 1989, Labor's Whalan remained Deputy Chief Minister for eight days under Liberal Chief Minister, Trevor Kaine, until Kaine announced his Alliance ministry with Residents Rally on 13 December 1989.
2 Bernard Collaery resigned all Ministerial responsibilities on 29 May 1991, losing confidence in Kaine led Alliance government with Residents Rally, due to unpopular decisions to close schools, close the Royal Canberra Hospital and amend planning laws.

See also
 Chief Minister of the Australian Capital Territory
 List of Australian Capital Territory ministries

References

Deputy Chief Minister

Australian